Hawkesley is an area of Birmingham, England.  It is part of 'The Three Estates', the housing estates Hawkesley, Pool Farm, and Primrose.  These are to the south of (and effectively sub-areas of) Kings Norton. The Ordnance Survey grid reference is SP0477.

Hawkesley was an important area of action during the English Civil War particularly around Hawkesley Farm which is situated further towards Longbridge site of the famous motor works.

Wast Hills Tunnel, on the Worcester and Birmingham Canal, passes beneath the area.

The Three Estates New Deal for Communities in place since 2001 has encouraged urban regeneration.

UK artists Gavin Wade and Alec Finlay working with poet Paul Conneally were commissioned to make public art in Hawkesley and as part of the work organised community Renga workshops across the Three Estates making a unique piece that forms part of Wade's huge Strategic Questions piece. The piece being co-funded by the Three Estates New Deal for Communities and Birmingham City Council.

External links 
 Birmingham City Council: Three Estates

Areas of Birmingham, West Midlands